is a bus-operating company in western Tama Area, mainly in Hachioji and Akiruno, Tokyo, Japan. It has  in a subsidiary which once took charge of bus routes in western Hachioji area and Ome area, and expressway bus routes. Although it now belongs to Keio Group, it was originally a bus section of Ome Electric Railway Co. (present JR Ōme Line).

History 
Nishi Tokyo Bus is a company established by a merger of Takao Jidōsha Co.(), Okutama Shinkō Co.() and Goō Jidōsha Co.() in 1963.

Takao Jidōsha's first route is between Hachiōji Station - Mount Takao foot which started operation in 1916. This is in only three years, after the Keio Denki Kidō (present Keio Corporation) operates around a bus for the first time (temporarily to railroad opening of traffic) in Tokyo in 1913, and in continuous operation, this became the first in the Tokyo-fu. Since This route competed with the route of Hachiōji Shigai Jidōsha (present Keio Dentetsu Bus Hachioji office) which started operation in 1923, Takao Jidōsha established the new route between Hachiōji Station - Kawarajuku, Ongata Village (present Hachioji City) in 1932, extended to Shimo-Ange by 1924, and it became the prime route of Takao Jidōsha. It entered under the influence of Keio Teito Electric Railway (present Keio Corporation) in 1955.

Okutama Shinkō is the company which Ome Electric Railway Co. established in 1928 by setting development of an area along the railroad line as the main purpose. The first bus line in Ome and Okutama area is between Futamatao Station (destination station of Ome Electric Railway of those days) and Hatonosu Station which was started operation by Okutama Jidōsha Co. in 1922. Ome Electric Railway purchased the Okutama Jidōsha in 1930, and it extended to Hikawa (Oku-Tama Station) in August of the same year. Although the railroad section of Ome Electric Railway was nationalized (present JR Ome Line) and the bus section operated by Ome Electric Railway succeedingly in April, 1944, all the bus enterprises of the Ome Electric Railway were transferred to the Okutama Shinkō, its subsidiary in April, 1946. Okutama Shinkō entered under the influence of Keio Teito Electric Railway in 1956.

In 1920, Ishikawa Jidōsha was replaced with the stagecoach which operated between Imaguma, Kawaguchi-mura (present Hachioji) - Hachioji (Hiraokachō) until then, and started operation of the bus of track reconstruction between Itsukaichi - Hachioji. It extended to Hachioji station in 1924, and the company name was changed into Goō Jidōsha Shōkai (it incorporated in 1947 and was re-change to Goō Jidōsha). It entered under the influence of Keio Teito Electric Railway in 1961.

The three companies which used as the influence of Keio Teito Electric Railway, moved to the joint head office of the Keio Line Higashi-Hachioji station (present Keio Hachioji station) next door in April, 1963 for merger preparation aiming at rationalization of bus operation, Okutama Shinkō merged other two companies on October 1, and Nishi Tokyo Bus launched. The symbol of a company is what designed the initial of Nishi Tokyo "NT" in the circle, and T imagined speediness and the feather of a bird, and it is published in the front of all the vehicles of a general route vehicle until it continues up to now.

Tama bus was split up by whole ownership and change of jurisdiction and commission of operation of an unprofitable route were started on April 1, 1999. Thereby, Ome Office was transferred to the Tama bus from 1999 to 2000, and Ongata Office from 2000 to 2005.
On August 5, 2008, the official website of Nishi Tokyo Bus announced that it unified the bus division of Tama Bus and succeeded all the routes which Tama bus operated from the first bus on September 1 of the same year, in order to attain improvement in convenience and the increase in efficiency of business operation. Although Tama bus which business was transferred remains as a company, and will concentrate on enterprises, such as lease, management, etc. of land and a building, from now on.

On September 30, 2007, a smart card "PASMO" was introduced into the some area around Hachioji, and was introduced also into all the remaining areas on January 25, 2009.

Depots 
 Head Office - 1-7, Myōjinchō 3-chōme, Hachioji, Tokyo, Japan
 Narahara Bus Office - 591-1, Naraharachō, Hachioji, Tokyo, Japan
 Nakano Gakuen Branch Office - 1100, Tobukimachi, Hachioji, Tokyo, Japan
 Itsukaichi Bus Office - 24, Tateyadai, Akiruno, Tokyo, Japan
 Hikawa Branch Office - 213, Hikawa, Okutama, Tokyo, Japan
 Ome Bus Office - 3-3, Suehirochō 1-chōme, Ome, Tokyo, Japan
 Ongata Bus Office - 281-1, Shimo-Ongatamachi, Hachioji, Tokyo, Japan
Ome and Ongata depots were depots of Tama Bus till August 31, 2008.

Major routes

Expressway bus routes 
All expressway bus routes were operated by Tama Bus till August 31, 2008.

Defunct route

Regular routes 

From Hino Station
for Utsugidai via Komiyamachi
for Hachiōji Station via Komiya Station Entrance
From Keio Hachiōji Station and JR Hachiōji Station
for Utsugidai via By-pass Ōya and via Kita-Hachiōji Station
for Junshin Academy and Tobuki via Sanyū
for Soka University Daimon, Junshin Academy and Tobuki via Babayato
for Soka University Eikō Gate and Tobuki via Hiyodoriyama-tunnel and Roadside Station Hachiōji-Takiyama
for Narahara Bus Office via Jinja-mae
for Imaguma and Musashi-Itsukaichi Station via Naraharachō and Kawaguchi Elementary School
for Tokyo Summerland and Akigawa Station via Naraharachō and Tobuki-Yuttarikan
for Narahara Bus Office and Kogakuin University via Nishi-Nakano
for Matsue-Jūtaku via City Hall east(市役所入口・元本郷公園東) and Yokokawachō-Jūtaku and Izumichō-Jūtaku
for Hōshōji-Danchi via Yotsuya
for Ōkubo via Yotsuya and Odano
for Ongata-Bus Terminal via Yotsuya and Ongata-Eigyōsho
for Takao Station South Exit via Yotsuya and Motohachi Branchi Office
From Nishi-Hachiōji Station
for Narahara Bus Office via Hachiōji City Hall and Nishi-Nakano
for Matsue-Jūtaku via City Hall east and Yokokawachō-Jūtaku and Izumichō-Jūtaku
for Ongata-Terminal via Yotsuya and Uenohara
for Green Town Takao and Takao Station North Exit via Chuo Expressway Moto-Hachioji Bus Stop
From Takao Station North Exit
for Ongata-Shako via Reien-Seimon
for Homest Town via Shiroyama-Ōhashi
for Hōshōji-Danchi via Reien-Seimon
for Takao-no-mori Wakuwaku Village via Reien-Seimon
for Ōkubo and Jinba-Plateau-Shita via Reien-Seimon
for Miyamachō via Reien-Seimon and Ongata Bus Terminal
From Haijima Station
for Kyorin University via Takatsuki and Tobuki
for Junshin Academy via Takatsuki
From Fussa Station
for Akigawa Station and Musashi-Itsukaichi Station via Akiruno City Office
for Hinode-Orikaeshijō via Akigawa Station and Æon Mall Hinode Shopping mall
for Soka University and Junshin Academy via Takatsuki
for Ozaku Station West via Hamura Station West
From Hamura Station
Shimmachi 9-chome circulation
From Ozaku Station
Mitsuhara Circulation
for Sugao High School via Tomoda
for Ōme Station via Tomoda
for Akigawa Station via Sugasebashi
From Mitake Station
for Mitake tozan railway Takimoto station
From Oku-Tama Station
for Kamihinata and Seitōbashi via Kawai Station
for Higashi-Nippara and Nippara-Shōnyūdō
for Lake Okutama, Tozura, Kamosawa-Nishi and Taba
for Minetani via Lake Okutama
for Kosuge via Lake Okutama
for Kosugenoyu Hot spring()
From Akigawa Station
for Sugao High School
From Musashi-Itsukaichi Station
for Matsuo and Tsurutsuru-Onsen via Sajigami
for Akikawa-keikoku Seotonoyu, Hossawa Fall Ent.(), Kazuma, Kami-Yōsawa, Koiwa and Fujikura via Jūrigi
for Tomin no mori

Community Bus routes 
 in Hachioji City
 in Akiruno City
 in Hamura City
 in Hinode Town - defunct on Jun. 9, 2008.

Buses 

Nishi Tokyo Bus owns the buses below:
Hino Motors
Blue Ribbon II non-step
Rainbow RJ middle-size bus
Rainbow HR / Rainbow II middle-size non-step bus
S'elega for expressway bus routes
Isuzu
Erga non-step
Erga Mio non-step
BXD50 bonnet bus - It was operated as "Yūyake-Koyake-go" till May, 2007.
Mitsubishi Fuso
Aero Queen for expressway bus routes
Nissan Diesel
JP, a middle-size bus with long body.
UA non-step
RA non-step and one-step with FLENDS system (low emission technology)

See also 

List of bus operating companies in Japan (east)
Keio Corporation
Keio Dentetsu Bus

References

External links

Nishi Tokyo Bus official site
Bus-Navi.com (for schedule information)

Bus companies of Japan
Transport companies based in Tokyo
Transport companies established in 1963
Keio Corporation
Western Tokyo
Japanese companies established in 1963